Mohd Alif bin Samsudin (born 1 February 1989 in Seremban, Negeri Sembilan) is a Malaysian footballer who plays for KSR SAINS as a defender.

Among his achievements is helping Negeri Sembilan to win 2009 Malaysia Cup and 2010 FA Cup. He also played in the 2010 Malaysia Cup final where his team lost 2–1 to Kelantan.

He has been called up to Malaysia national football team for a friendly match against Yemen national football team in 2010, and made his debut in this match.

Honours
Melaka United
 Malaysia Premier League: 2016

External links
 
 Alif Samsudin Statistics

References

Living people
1989 births
Malaysian footballers
Malaysia international footballers
Negeri Sembilan FA players
People from Negeri Sembilan
Sime Darby F.C. players
Malaysia Super League players
Association football fullbacks
Melaka United F.C. players